Oliver Davis Mann (December 10, 1877 – July 9, 1956) was an American football player and coach.  A native of Danville, Illinois, he attended Rutgers College, graduating in the Class of 1901.  He played college football for the Rutgers Scarlet Knights from 1897 to 1900.  The New York Times wrote that Mann "for three years was the Captain of the best team Rutgers College ever had on the gridiron."  He was also Rutgers' head football coach in the 1903 and 1905 seasons.  In two seasons as head coach, Mann compiled a record of 7–10–1.  He later resided in Danville, Illinois.  In a draft registration card completed at the time of World War I, Mann indicated that he was a self-employed lawyer in Danville.  He died in July 1956 and was buried at the Spring Hill Mausoleum in Danville.

Head coaching record

References

External links
 

1877 births
1956 deaths
Rose–Hulman Fightin' Engineers football coaches
19th-century players of American football
Rutgers Scarlet Knights football coaches
Rutgers Scarlet Knights football players
People from Danville, Illinois
Players of American football from Illinois
Illinois lawyers